Atul may refer to:

People
Atul Agnihotri (born 1970), Indian actor
Atul Bakshi (born 1956), Indian glass artist
Atul Bhatkhalkar (born 1965), Indian politician
Atul Butte, American biotechnology entrepreneur
Atul Dodiya (born 1959), Indian artist
Atul Gawande (born 1965), American surgeon
Atul Kale (born 1970), Indian actor and singer
Atul Kapoor (born 1966), Indian actor 
Atul Kasbekar (born 1965), Indian photographer 
Atul Khatri (born 1968), Indian comedian
Atul Kochhar (born 1969), Indian chef
Atul Kulkarni (born 1965), Indian actor
Atul Kumar (chemist), Indian chemist
Atul Kumar (ophthalmologist), Indian ophthalmologist
Atul Parchure (born 1966), Indian actor
Atul Punj (born 1957), Indian businessman
Atul Rai (born 1982), Indian politician
Atul Prasad Sen (1871–1934), Indian writer and musician
Atul Sharma (born 1961), Indian musician

Other uses
Atul, Gujarat, a village in India
Atul (company), a chemical conglomerate in India
Atul Auto, a rickshaw manufacturer in India